The Branson Tri-Lakes News is the local newspaper covering Branson, Taney County and Stone County in Missouri, and traces its roots to the oldest publications in Taney County.

Since 2009, it publishes twice a week on Wednesday and Saturday. It used to be published five times a week.

In 1992, the Taney County Republican merged with the Branson Beacon, the White River Leader, and the Southwest Missourian to form the Branson Tri-Lakes Daily News. It retained that name until it stopped being a daily newspaper in 2009.

The Taney County Republican began publishing in 1895. The Branson Tri-Lakes News recognized 100 years of continuous publication by itself and its various precursors in January 2012.

Branson Tri-Lakes News was acquired by Lancaster Management Inc in November 2013.

The paper also produces several regular special publications, including the monthly entertainment-themed Ozark Mountain Visitor, and Branson This Week. All of its publications, including both editions of the Branson Tri-Lakes News, are full color.

Awards
In 2011, the Branson Tri-Lakes News was awarded first place in its class for General Excellence and Best News Content by the Missouri Press Association.

In 2022, the Branson Tri-Lakes News received first place for Best Overall Design, second place for Best Investigative Reporting, and third place for Best News Story, Community Service, General Excellence, Best Story about Education, Magazine/Alternative Publication, and Best Business Story as part of 12 awards from the Missouri Press Association's Better Newspaper Awards. 
<P>

References

External links 
 Official site of the Branson Tri-Lakes News
Lancaster Management, parent company of the Branson Tri-Lakes News

Weekly newspapers published in the United States
Newspapers published in Missouri
Branson, Missouri
1992 establishments in Missouri